The 2022 Liga Femenina, also known as Liga Femenina Pluspetrol 2022 for sponsorship reasons, was the 2nd season of the Peruvian Liga Femenina, the highest level of Peruvian women's football. The season began on 2 April and ended on 30 November.

Unlike the previous season, the tournament was played in a decentralized way with each team playing matches at their respective home stadium.

Alianza Lima were the defending champions and successfully retained their title after defeating Carlos A. Mannucci 4–1 on aggregate in the finals. As champions, Alianza Lima qualified for the 2022 Copa Libertadores Femenina.

Competition format
The season was divided into two stages: Regular stage and Play-offs. The regular stage was played under a single round-robin format with the 13 teams playing each other once for a total of 12 matches per team (6 matches at home and 6 away matches).

For the play-offs stage, the 13 teams were splitted into two groups of 6 and 7 (championship play-offs and relegation play-offs respectively) according to their final placement in the regular stage. The championship play-offs were contested by teams ranked 1st to 6th in the regular stage, the 6 teams played in a hexagonal where they faced other teams once for a total of 5 matches per team. The top four teams from the hexagonal advanced to the single-leg semi-finals with teams ranked 1st and 2nd hosting the matches. Winners of semi-finals played the finals on a home-and-away two-legged basis to decide the national champion, while losers played the single-leg third place play-off. Originally, the final was scheduled to be played in Lima on a single-leg format.

The relegation play-offs were contested by teams ranked 7th to 13th in the regular stage, the 7 teams played in a heptagonal where they faced other teams once for a total of 6 matches per team. After the last matchday, the team placed 7th was relegated to the 2023 Copa Perú Femenina while the team placed 6th played a promotion play-off against the runners-up of the 2022 Copa Perú Femenina, winners of this play-off played the 2023 Liga Femenina while the losers played in the 2023 Copa Perú Femenina.

Teams
A total of 13 teams played in the 2022 Liga Femenina season, the same ones that played in the previous 2021 season.

Stadia and locations

Regular stage

Results
The match schedule was decided based on the draw which was held on 8 March 2022.

Play-offs
The match schedule of Play-offs stage was announced on 16 August 2022.

Championship play-offs
In the championship play-offs, teams ranked 1st and 2nd in the regular stage started with 2 and 1 extra points respectively. Points earned during the regular stage did not carry over during the hexagonal.

Hexagonal table

Bracket
The semi-final matchups were:
SF1: Hexagonal 1st place vs. Hexagonal 4th place
SF2: Hexagonal 2nd place vs. Hexagonal 3rd place

Semi-finals
In the semi-finals, if a match was level at the end of normal 90 minutes playing time, extra time was not played and a penalty shoot-out was used to determine the winners.

Third place playoff

Finals
The format of the final was changed from a single-leg match to a home-and-away two-legged series.

Relegation play-offs
In the relegation play-offs, teams ranked 13th and 12th in the regular stage started with 2 and 1 points less respectively. Points earned during the regular stage did not carry over during the heptagonal.

Heptagonal table

Relegation play-off

Top scorers

See also
 2022 Copa Perú Femenina

References

2022 in South American football leagues
2022 in Peruvian football